Luxembourg Rugby Federation is the governing body for rugby union in Luxembourg. It was founded in 1974 and became affiliated to the International Rugby Board in 1991. Luxembourg Rugby team plays its matches at the Stade Josy Barthel in Luxembourg-City. Luxembourg are ranked 59th (on October 12th, 2019) in the world according to the International Rugby Board.

See also
 Luxembourg national rugby union team
 Luxembourg national rugby sevens team
 Rugby union in Luxembourg
 Luxembourg women's national rugby union team

Clubs
 Rugby Club Luxembourg
 Rugby Club Walferdange
 Cercle sportif des Communautés européennes - section Rugby
 Rugby Eagles Luxembourg

External links
 Official Site
World Rugby Rankings

Rugby union in Luxembourg
Rugby union
Luxembourg
Sports organizations established in 1974